Murillo/Hane Field Aerodrome  is located  north northwest of Murillo, Ontario, Canada.

References

External links

Registered aerodromes in Ontario
Transport in Thunder Bay District